Robert B. Denhardt, scholar and author, was born in Kentucky in 1942. He received his Ph.D. in Public Administration from the University of Kentucky in 1968.

Denhardt is best known for his work in public administration theory and organizational behavior, especially leadership and organizational change. In The New Public Service: Serving, not Steering, he developed a new model of governance that stresses the need to engage citizens in governance of their communities.

Denhardt started his career as an assistant professor at the University of Central Florida. He taught at the University of New Orleans, University of Kansas, University of Missouri, University of Colorado, and University of Delaware. Currently, Denhardt is the Lincoln Professor of Leadership and Ethics, director of the School of Public Affairs at Arizona State University, and a distinguished visiting scholar at the University of Delaware.

Denhardt is a Past President of the American Society for Public Administration (ASPA), a nationwide organization of academics and practitioners in the field of public administration at all levels of government. He was the founder and first chair of ASPA's National Campaign for Public Service, an effort to assert the dignity and worth of public service across the nation. He is also a member of the National Academy of Public Administration and a Fellow of the Canadian Centre for Management Development. He received the Dwight Waldo Award for lifetime achievement in scholarship from the American Society for Public Administration in 2004.  He was a Fulbright Scholar in Australia in 1990.  In 2007, he was appointed as an Arizona State University Regents’ Professor.

Denhardt has published nineteen books, including The Dance of Leadership, The New Public Service, Managing Human Behavior in Public and Nonprofit Organizations, The Pursuit of Significance, In the Shadow of Organization, Theories of Public Organization, Public Administration: An Action Orientation, Executive Leadership in the Public Service, The Revitalization of the Public Service, and Pollution and Public Policy. He has published over one hundred articles in professional journals.

Denhardt currently conducts training, facilitation, counseling, and intervention in leadership development and civic engagement.  The Dance of Leadership Workshop is based on his book, "The Dance of Leadership", and focuses on the art of leadership, employing material from art, music, and especially dance to discover new ways of thinking about leadership and new ways of sharpening one’s leadership skills.

External links
 The Dance of Leadership Consulting Group

1942 births
Living people
University of Missouri faculty
University of Kentucky alumni
University of Central Florida faculty
University of New Orleans faculty
University of Kansas faculty
University of Colorado faculty
University of Delaware faculty
Arizona State University faculty